Petr Šedivák (born 13 November 1961) is a Czech judoka. He competed at the 1988 Summer Olympics and the 1992 Summer Olympics.

References

1961 births
Living people
Czech male judoka
Olympic judoka of Czechoslovakia
Judoka at the 1988 Summer Olympics
Judoka at the 1992 Summer Olympics
Sportspeople from Plzeň